Kampong Kilanas is a village in Brunei-Muara District, Brunei, on the western outskirts of the capital Bandar Seri Begawan. The population was 4,589 in 2016. It is one of the villages within Mukim Kilanas.

Infrastructures

Schools 
Orang Kaya Setia Bakti Primary School is the village's primary school, whereas Pengiran Anak Puteri Majeedah Nuurul Bolkiah Religious School is the village's school for the country's Islamic religious primary education.

Sayyidina Hasan Secondary School, the sole secondary school in Mukim Kilanas, is located within the village boundary.

Mosque 
Kampong Kilanas Mosque is the village mosque and was opened for use on 29 November 1968. It can accommodate 1,700 worshippers.

Notable people 

 Halbi Mohd Yussof (born 1956), a soldier, politician and minister.

References 

Kilanas